Sir Thomas Bennet (1543 - 1627) was an English merchant and Lord Mayor of London in 1603-04.

A leading London mercer, on 7 February 1594, Bennet was elected an Alderman of the City of London for Vintry Ward. He was Sheriff of London for 1594-95 and Master of the Mercers' Company in 1595-96. He became Master Mercer again in 1602 and, in 1603, Bennet was elected Lord Mayor of London.

Bennet was knighted by King James I on 26 July 1603 and, in 1604, he was elected Alderman of Lime Street Ward, serving until 1612. He was President of the Royal Bethlem and Bridewell Hospitals from 1606 to 1613 and in 1610 became Master Mercer again. In 1612 he transferred as Alderman for Bassishaw Ward which he represented until 1627. He was also President of St Bartholomew's Hospital from 1623 until his death on 20 February 1627.
 
His elder surviving son, Sir Simon Bennet was created a baronet upon his death in 1627. His younger son, Richard Bennet and his wife Elizabeth daughter of Sir Matthew Cradock, are ancestors of the Marquesses of Salisbury; Richard Bennet's widow married secondly Sir Heneage Finch, Speaker of the House of Commons.

See also

 List of Lord Mayors of London

References

External links
 Burke's Peerage & Baronetage

1543 births
1627 deaths
English merchants
Councilmen and Aldermen of the City of London
Sheriffs of the City of London
17th-century lord mayors of London
Knights Bachelor